Mercersburg Historic District is a national historic district centered on the center square of Mercersburg in Franklin County, Pennsylvania. The district includes 124 contributing buildings and 1 contributing site in the central business district and surrounding residential areas of Mercersburg. The residential buildings include a number of sheathed log, stone, and brick dwellings, with some dating to the 18th century.  The district has a number of notable examples of the Federal, Greek Revival, and Colonial Revival styles.

Notable non-residential buildings include the Presbyterian Church (1794, 1885), United Church of Christ (1845), Mansion House Hotel, James Buchanan Hotel, McKinstry Building, and First National Bank.  Located in the district and separately listed is the Lane House.

It was listed on the National Register of Historic Places in 1978, with a boundary increase in 1989.

References 

Historic districts on the National Register of Historic Places in Pennsylvania
Federal architecture in Pennsylvania
Greek Revival architecture in Pennsylvania
Colonial Revival architecture in Pennsylvania
Historic districts in Franklin County, Pennsylvania
National Register of Historic Places in Franklin County, Pennsylvania